Kenyon Lee Martin Sr. (born December 30, 1977) is an American former professional basketball player who played 15 seasons in the National Basketball Association (NBA). As a power forward, he played for the New Jersey Nets, Denver Nuggets, Los Angeles Clippers, New York Knicks and Milwaukee Bucks of the NBA, and the Xinjiang Flying Tigers of China. He played college basketball for the Cincinnati Bearcats and was named the national college player of the year during his senior season. Martin was drafted with the first overall pick in the 2000 NBA draft by the New Jersey Nets.

Early years
Martin was born in Saginaw, Michigan, on December 30, 1977, to Lydia Moore, a single mother of two. He has a sister, Tamara, who is 3½ years older. Shortly after, the family moved south to the Oak Cliff neighborhood of Dallas, where Martin's mother worked two jobs. Later, Martin was often watched by his sister while their mother worked.

Martin attended three high schools in four years, but he sought refuge in sports, playing basketball, baseball, and football. In high school, many major universities showed interest in his basketball prowess, but the University of Cincinnati and assistant coach John Loyer recruited him hardest after seeing him play AAU ball after his junior year. He graduated from Bryan Adams High School in Dallas in 1996 (he was named to the school's hall of fame in 2009).

College career
Martin went to the University of Cincinnati and played for the Cincinnati Bearcats under the direction of head coach Bob Huggins. He was homesick early in his freshman year and actually took a bus back home to Dallas. His mother and his older sister, who by then were both working two jobs and attending college, steered him to return to finish college.

By Martin's junior year, he led Cincinnati to a 27-6 record and was named second-team All-Conference USA and, in the summer following, he led the U.S. team to the gold medal in the World University Games, leading the team in scoring and rebounding.

As a senior in 1999–2000, Martin averaged 18.9 points, 9.7 rebounds and 3.5 blocks per game during a season in which the Bearcats were ranked #1 for 12 weeks. That season, he recorded his second triple double with 28 points, 13 rebounds, and 10 blocks vs. Memphis (in 1997, he recorded 24/23/10 vs. DePaul). Martin was the consensus National Player of the Year, earning numerous awards from various organizations, and the team was ranked #1 in the nation at the conclusion of the regular season. However, Martin suffered a broken leg three minutes into the Bearcats' first game of the Conference USA Tournament, keeping him out of the NCAA Tournament that year. The team finished with a record of 29-4.

Martin remains the Bearcats' all-time leader in career blocked shots (292) and field goal percentage (.586). Cincinnati retired his #4 jersey on April 25, 2000. Later that year, he was selected first overall in the 2000 NBA draft by the New Jersey Nets. As of 2019, Martin remains the last American-born college senior to have been the top overall pick.

Martin graduated with a bachelor's degree in criminal justice.

Professional career

New Jersey Nets (2000–2004)
As a rookie for the New Jersey Nets, Martin averaged 12 points, 7.4 rebounds and 1.7 blocks per game. He was named to the NBA All-Rookie First Team and finished second in voting for NBA Rookie of the Year. In his second season, Martin averaged 14.9 points, 5.3 rebounds, 1.3 steals and 1.7 blocks per game in helping the Nets rise from last place in the Atlantic Division to an Eastern Conference title and the best season to date in the Nets' NBA history. Along with Jason Kidd, Kerry Kittles, Keith Van Horn and Richard Jefferson, Martin led the Nets to the 2002 NBA Finals, where they were swept by the Los Angeles Lakers. In his third season Martin again helped his team into the NBA finals, where the Nets lost in six games to the San Antonio Spurs. The next year, Martin averaged 16.7 points, 9.5 rebounds and 1.3 blocks en route to his first NBA All-Star selection, as a backup forward for the Eastern Conference All-Stars. In the 2004 NBA All-Star Game, Martin scored 17 points, grabbed 7 rebounds and had 3 assists.

Martin and teammate Alonzo Mourning almost fought when Martin mocked Mourning's life-threatening kidney disease. Martin later admitted that he had made a mistake and apologized to Mourning. On an episode of the Scoop B Radio Podcast, Martin told Brandon Scoop B Robinson that Mourning thought that Martin should have been working as hard as he was in morning shootarounds, but he was never a shootaround guy.
Martin now participates in Mourning's annual charity basketball game (see below "Off the court").

Denver Nuggets (2004–2011)

At the end of the 2003–04 season, Martin was traded to the Denver Nuggets for three future first-round draft picks in a sign-and-trade deal.

Martin played in 70 games during the 2004–05 season, averaging 15.5 points and 7.3 rebounds; however, a problem with his knee was detected shortly into the off-season, and on May 16, 2005, Kenyon underwent microfracture surgery on his left knee.

During the 2005–06 season, Martin missed 26 games due to knee tendinitis, but was able to return in time for the playoffs. During that playoff series against the Los Angeles Clippers, Martin was suspended from the Denver Nuggets indefinitely for "conduct detrimental to the team." During halftime of game two of the first round series, Martin got into an argument with head coach George Karl over his playing time, and refused to play for the second half of the game. During the offseason, Karl and Martin apparently "patched things up."

Believing injuries were behind him, Martin learned the swelling now occurring in his right knee would require another microfracture procedure. On November 15, 2006, after playing two regular season games, Martin underwent his second knee operation in less than two years. Martin is believed to be the first NBA player to have, and to return from, microfracture surgery on both knees.

Martin was fined $15,000 by the NBA when, during the third quarter of a 2006 game against the Chicago Bulls, Martin as well as some of his friends got into a verbal altercation with some fans. He was also cautioned to no longer bring his entourage to games.

To symbolize a fresh start to his career, Kenyon changed his uniform number from 6 to the number 4, which he wore in college, for the 2007–08 season.

Xinjiang Flying Tigers (2011)
Martin became an unrestricted free agent in the summer of 2011; however, due to the 2011 NBA lockout, he opted to sign a one-year contract with the Xinjiang Flying Tigers of the Chinese Basketball Association. His contract reportedly would have made him the highest paid player in the Chinese league's history. On December 24, 2011, Martin was released from the club so that he could "take care of family affairs". Martin was initially not allowed to return to the NBA until the Flying Tigers' season ended on February 15, 2012, if not later due to the 2012 CBA Playoffs. However, the FIBA granted him an earlier release on February 2.

Los Angeles Clippers (2012)
On February 3, 2012, Martin signed with the Los Angeles Clippers. In his first game with the Clippers, Martin scored 6 points and collected four rebounds in a loss to the Cleveland Cavaliers.

New York Knicks (2013–2014)
On February 21, 2013, Martin agreed to join the New York Knicks on a 10-day contract, which reunited him with Jason Kidd. He officially joined the team on February 23. He was signed to a second 10-day contract on March 5, and signed for the remainder of the season on March 15. Upon his signing, he provided a large amount of help to a Knicks team that was depleted in the frontcourt, replacing Tyson Chandler, who was out with a neck injury, in the Knicks' starting lineup. On July 25, 2013, Martin re-signed with the Knicks for the 2013–14 season.

Milwaukee Bucks (2015)
On January 9, 2015, Martin signed a 10-day contract with the Milwaukee Bucks. He went on to sign a second 10-day contract on January 19, and a rest-of-season contract on January 29. Martin's final NBA game was on February 2, 2015, in a 82–75 win over the Toronto Raptors where Martin recorded 4 points and 3 rebounds. On February 19, 2015, he was waived by the Bucks.

On July 3, 2015, Martin announced his retirement from professional basketball.

Career statistics

NBA

Regular season

|-
| style="text-align:left;"|
| style="text-align:left;"|New Jersey
| 68 || 68 || 33.4 || .445 || .091 || .630 || 7.4 || 1.9 || 1.1 || 1.7 || 12.0
|-
| style="text-align:left;"|
| style="text-align:left;"|New Jersey
| 73 || 73 || 34.3 || .463 || .224 || .678 || 5.3 || 2.6 || 1.2 || 1.7 || 14.9
|-
| style="text-align:left;"|
| style="text-align:left;"|New Jersey
| 77 || 77 || 34.1 || .470 || .209 || .653 || 8.3 || 2.4 || 1.3 || .9 || 16.7
|-
| style="text-align:left;"|
| style="text-align:left;"|New Jersey
| 65 || 62 || 34.6 || .488 || .280 || .684 || 9.5 || 2.5 || 1.5 || 1.3 || 16.7
|-
| style="text-align:left;"|
| style="text-align:left;"|Denver
| 70 || 67 || 32.5 || .490 || .000 || .646 || 7.3 || 2.4 || 1.4 || 1.1 || 15.5
|-
| style="text-align:left;"|
| style="text-align:left;"|Denver
| 56 || 49 || 27.6 || .495 || .227 || .712 || 6.3 || 1.4 || .8 || .9 || 12.9
|-
| style="text-align:left;"|
| style="text-align:left;"|Denver
| 2 || 2 || 31.5 || .500 || .000 || .250 || 10.0 || .5 || .0 || .0 || 9.5
|-
| style="text-align:left;"|
| style="text-align:left;"|Denver
| 71 || 71 || 30.4 || .538 || .182 || .580 || 6.5 || 1.3 || 1.2 || 1.2 || 12.4
|-
| style="text-align:left;"|
| style="text-align:left;"|Denver
| 66 || 66 || 32.0 || .491 || .368 || .604 || 6.0 || 2.0 || 1.5 || 1.1 || 11.7
|-
| style="text-align:left;"|
| style="text-align:left;"|Denver
| 58 || 58 || 34.2 || .456 || .276 || .557 || 9.4 || 1.9 || 1.2 || 1.1 || 11.5
|-
| style="text-align:left;"|
| style="text-align:left;"|Denver
| 48 || 48 || 25.7 || .511 || .222 || .583 || 6.2 || 2.3 || .9 || .7 || 8.6
|-
| style="text-align:left;"|
| style="text-align:left;"|L.A. Clippers
| 42 || 0 || 22.4 || .441 || .231 || .370 || 4.3 || .4 || 1.0 || 1.0 || 5.2
|-
| style="text-align:left;"|
| style="text-align:left;"|New York
| 18 || 11 || 23.9 || .602 ||  || .425 || 5.3 || .4 || .9 || .9 || 7.2
|-
| style="text-align:left;"|
| style="text-align:left;"|New York
| 32 || 15 || 19.8 || .512 || .000 || .579 || 4.2 || 1.6 || .8 || .8 || 4.3
|-
| style="text-align:left;"|
| style="text-align:left;"|Milwaukee
| 11 || 0 || 9.5 || .409 ||  || 1.000 || 1.7 || .5 || .5 || .5 || 1.8
|- class="sortbottom"
| style="text-align:center;" colspan="2"|Career
| 757 || 667 || 30.6 || .483 || .234 || .629 || 6.8 || 1.9 || 1.2 || 1.1 || 12.3
|- class="sortbottom"
| style="text-align:center;" colspan="2"|All-Star
| 1 || 0 || 23.0 || .800 || .000 || .500 || 7.0 || 3.0 || .0 || .0 || 17.0

Playoffs

|-
| style="text-align:left;"|2002
| style="text-align:left;"|New Jersey
| 20 || 20 || 37.5 || .424 || .222 || .691 || 5.8 || 2.9 || 1.2 || 1.3 || 16.8
|-
| style="text-align:left;"|2003
| style="text-align:left;"|New Jersey
| 20 || 20 || 38.9 || .453 || .091 || .693 || 9.4 || 2.9 || 1.5 || 1.6 || 18.9
|-
| style="text-align:left;"|2004
| style="text-align:left;"|New Jersey
| 11 || 11 || 37.2 || .533 || .000 || .750 || 11.0 || 1.1 || 1.2 || 1.3 || 19.1
|-
| style="text-align:left;"|2005
| style="text-align:left;"|Denver
| 5 || 5 || 32.8 || .466 || .000 || .615 || 5.6 || 1.2 || 1.0 || 1.0 || 12.4
|-
| style="text-align:left;"|2006
| style="text-align:left;"|Denver
| 2 || 0 || 17.5 || .308 ||  || .500 || 4.5 || .5 || 2.0 || 1.0 || 4.5
|-
| style="text-align:left;"|2008
| style="text-align:left;"|Denver
| 4 || 4 || 29.5 || .441 ||  || .625 || 6.3 || 1.3 || 1.0 || .5 || 8.8
|-
| style="text-align:left;"|2009
| style="text-align:left;"|Denver
| 16 || 16 || 33.6 || .497 || .200 || .657 || 5.9 || 2.1 || 1.1 || .9 || 10.9
|-
| style="text-align:left;"|2010
| style="text-align:left;"|Denver
| 6 || 6 || 34.2 || .480 || .000 || .632 || 8.3 || 1.3 || 1.5 || 1.2 || 10.0
|-
| style="text-align:left;"|2011
| style="text-align:left;"|Denver
| 5 || 5 || 29.6 || .480 ||  || .611 || 7.8 || 1.6 || .4 || .4 || 11.8
|-
| style="text-align:left;"|2012
| style="text-align:left;"|L.A. Clippers
| 11 || 0 || 17.5 || .524 ||  || .625 || 3.2 || .3 || .4 || 1.7 || 4.5
|-
| style="text-align:left;"|2013
| style="text-align:left;"|New York
| 12 || 1 || 21.1 || .580 ||  || .550 || 4.5 || .9 || .8 || 1.4 || 5.8
|- class="sortbottom"
| style="text-align:center;" colspan="2"|Career
| 112 || 88 || 32.0 || .470 || .129 || .679 || 6.8 || 1.8 || 1.1 || 1.2 || 12.9

CBA

|-
| style="text-align:left;"|2011–12
| style="text-align:left;"|Xinjiang Flying Tigers
| 12 || 11 || 29.9 || .521 || .000 || .613 || 9.7 || 1.8 || .8 || .6 || 13.9

Personal life
Martin is the half-brother of former Colorado Buffaloes shooting guard Richard Roby. He is also the cousin of Robert "50" Martin of AND1 Mixtape Tour fame.

Martin's son, Kenyon Martin Jr., played his postgraduate year for the IMG Academy after graduating from the Sierra Canyon School. On March 24, 2020, his son declared for the 2020 NBA draft and was selected 52nd overall by the Sacramento Kings.

In 2019, Martin requested that his child support obligations be reduced to reflect his lower income since the end of his NBA career. He stated that his current obligations, which included paying his ex-wife Heather $3,000 per month in child support, plus "additional child support" of $7,000 per month in credit card bills, a new car for Heather every three years and private school fees for the children, were no longer affordable.

See also

References

External links

 
 

1977 births
Living people
African-American basketball players
All-American college men's basketball players
American expatriate basketball people in China
American men's basketball players
Basketball players from Michigan
Big3 players
Bryan Adams High School alumni
Cincinnati Bearcats men's basketball players
Denver Nuggets players
Goodwill Games medalists in basketball
Los Angeles Clippers players
Milwaukee Bucks players
National Basketball Association All-Stars
New Jersey Nets draft picks
New Jersey Nets players
New York Knicks players
Power forwards (basketball)
Basketball players from Dallas
Sportspeople from Saginaw, Michigan
United States men's national basketball team players
Universiade gold medalists for the United States
Universiade medalists in basketball
Xinjiang Flying Tigers players
Medalists at the 1999 Summer Universiade
Competitors at the 2001 Goodwill Games
21st-century African-American sportspeople
20th-century African-American sportspeople
American men's 3x3 basketball players